Lupine Meadow Roll is a 1990 bronze sculpture by John B. Mortensen, installed in Salt Lake City's Triad Center in the U.S. state of Utah. The bear sculpture measures approximately 1 ft. x 8 in. x 2 ft. and rests on a concrete base which measures approximately 2 x 2 x 2 ft. According to the Smithsonian Institution, which surveyed the artwork as part of its "Save Outdoor Sculpture!" program in 1993, this cast is the ninth of twenty.

References

1990 sculptures
Bronze sculptures in Utah
Outdoor sculptures in Salt Lake City
Sculptures of bears
Statues in Utah